Gandhinagara is a 1968 Indian Kannada-language film, directed by K. S. L. Swamy and produced by C Venku Reddy. The film stars Rajkumar, Kalpana, K. S. Ashwath, Balakrishna and Narasimharaju. The film had musical score by Chellapilla Satyam.

Cast

Rajkumar as Shekhar
Kalpana as Shanta
K. S. Ashwath
Balakrishna
Narasimharaju as Sheshappa
Dwarakish as Prabhakara
B. V. Radha
Pandari Bai in a cameo

References

External links
 

1968 films
1960s Kannada-language films
Films scored by Satyam (composer)
Films directed by K. S. L. Swamy